RX J0720.4−3125 is a neutron star in the constellation Canis Major. It was discovered in 1997 in the ROSAT All-sky survey. It is a member of the Magnificent Seven, a group of neutron stars that are relatively near to the Solar System. RX J0720.4–3125 has a radius of around 5 km. Its spectrum and temperature appear to be mysteriously changing over several years. The nature of the changes are unclear, but it is possible there was an event such as the star's absorption of an accretion disc.

References

Canis Major
Neutron stars
ROSAT objects